Dag Erik Pedersen (born 6 June 1959) is a retired Norwegian road racing cyclist with a long career as professional. He won 3 stages in the Giro d'Italia and he came 4th in the Road race in the 1981 World Championship. He was a member of Birkenes IL, previously for Larvik SK and Grenland SK before he turned professional after the worlds in September 1981.

Pedersen won a total of 43 professional races in his 12 years in Italy and Holland. He won the Norwegian National Road Race Championship in 1992.

After he retired as a cyclist he began working for the Norwegian Broadcasting Corporation where he now works as an anchor. He won best news and sports anchor in Norway in 2002, 2004, 2005 and 2008. He speaks fluent English, German, Italian, French, Dutch and basic Spanish.

Pedersen has also been working with film director Nils Gaup on several occasions. Best known are "When Dylan came to Langesund" and "Deadline Torp". In 2000, he made a TV documentary about King Harald of Norway. He has also made TV portraits of famous people like Sir Paul McCartney, Andrea Bocelli, B. B. King, Michael Persbrandt, Rod Stewart, Kronprins Haakon of Norway, Nobel Peace Prize winner Rigoberta Menchú and Bernard Kouchner. In the early 1980s he had a career as a pop singer issuing two singles and the album Gatelangs.

He spent 24 days in prison in 1994 for speeding.

In an interview with Norwegian media VG/NRK., Pedersen did not exclude that he might have been drugged, when he in the 1980s got injections in which he did not know the content.

Already in 2008, Pedersen said that injections with unknown content was a part of the normal daily routines as a bicycle professional. Pedersen tested positive for ephedrine at the 1981 Milk Race (Tour of Britain) and got a one-month suspension.

Major results

1977
 National Junior Road Championships
1st  Road race
1st  Time trial
1979
 1st Overall Ringerike GP
 2nd Overall Tour de Berlin
1980
 2nd Overall Rheinland-Pfalz Rundfahrt
1981
 1st Overall GP Tell
 1st Overall Ringerike GP
 1st Stage 9 Milk Race
1982
 1st Giro del Lazio
 5th Giro dell'Emilia
 5th GP Industria & Artigianato
 7th Coppa Agostoni
 8th Overall Ruota d'Oro
1983
 2nd Giro del Veneto
 3rd Giro dell'Emilia
 3rd Overall Tour of the Americas
 4th Overall Tour de Romandie
 8th Overall Tour of Sweden
1984
 1st Overall Tour of Norway
1st Stage 4
 2nd Giro di Campania
 6th Milan–San Remo
 7th Overall Giro del Trentino
 10th Overall Giro d'Italia
1st Stages 9 & 16
 10th Paris–Tours
1986
 1st Stage 15 Giro d'Italia
 2nd Giro dell'Emilia
 3rd Liège–Bastogne–Liège
 3rd Overall Giro di Puglia
 3rd GP Industria & Artigianato
 4th Giro dell'Etna
 6th Trofeo Pantalica
 7th Tre Valli Varesine
 7th Züri-Metzgete
 8th Overall Circuit Cycliste Sarthe
 8th Giro del Trentino
 10th Paris–Tours
 10th Giro di Campania
 10th Nice–Alassio
1987
 4th Grand Prix Cerami
 9th Milan–San Remo
 9th Overall Tour de Romandie
1989
 1st Overall Tour of Norway
1st Stages 1 & 5
 2nd Milano–Torino
 5th Brabantse Pijl
1990
 1st Overall Ringerike GP
1st Stage 5
 2nd Overall Tour of Norway
1st Stages 4, 5 & 6
1991
 1st Overall Tour of Norway
1st Stages 2 & 5
 2nd Overall Tour of Sweden
1st Stages 3 & 6
1992
 1st  Road race, National Road Championships
 3rd Overall Tour of Norway

Grand Tour general classification results timeline

References

1959 births
Living people
Doping cases in cycling
Norwegian male cyclists
Norwegian Giro d'Italia stage winners
Norwegian sportspeople in doping cases
Norwegian journalists
NRK people
Sports commentators
Norwegian prisoners and detainees
Prisoners and detainees of Norway
Sportspeople from Skien
Norwegian expatriate sportspeople in Italy